Linda Matsebula (born ) is a Swazi male weightlifter, competing in the 85 kg category and representing Swaziland at international competitions. He participated at the 2010 Commonwealth Games in the 85 kg event.

Major competitions

References

1983 births
Living people
Swazi male weightlifters
Weightlifters at the 2010 Commonwealth Games
Commonwealth Games competitors for Eswatini
Place of birth missing (living people)